Asolo Duomo (duomo di Asolo) is the main church in the Italian city of Asolo. Its full title is the Provostorial and Collegiate Church of St Mary of the Assumption (chiesa prepositurale e collegiata di Santa Maria Assunta). It is a provostorial parish church and the seat of a vicariate of the diocese of Treviso. It was granted collegiate status in 1959, when it was granted an establishment of titular and honorary canons headed by a provost, who was also the parish priest.

Churches in the province of Treviso